Escaping the Future is a Big Finish Productions audio drama featuring Lisa Bowerman as Bernice Summerfield, a character from the spin-off media based on the long-running British science fiction television series Doctor Who.

Plot 
The galaxy is in turmoil. As Bernice's friends fight to keep the Deindum at bay, can Bernice and Peter find out who they are, and how to stop them?

Cast
Bernice Summerfield - Lisa Bowerman
Irving Braxiatel - Miles Richardson
Bev Tarrant - Louise Faulkner
Adrian Wall - Harry Myers
Joseph - Steven Wickham
Hass - Paul Wolfe
Doggles -  Sam Stevens
Peter Summerfield - Thomas Grant
Lianna - Rachel Lawrence

External links
Professor Bernice Summerfield: Escaping the Future 

Escaping the Future
Fiction set in the 27th century